Julio Herrera (March 16, 1911 – ?) was a Mexican equestrian. He finished last in the individual mixed dressage at the 1968 Summer Olympics.

References

External links
 

1911 births
Date of death unknown
Olympic equestrians of Mexico
Equestrians at the 1968 Summer Olympics
Mexican male equestrians
Mexican dressage riders